Operation Audacity (Filipino: Oplan Pagpangahas) was a military operation during the 2000 Philippine campaign against the Moro Islamic Liberation Front which took place in Cotabato, Philippines. The Philippine Army, primarily units of its 6th Infantry Division, assaulted and cleared Moro Islamic Liberation Front forces from the Carmen-Banisilan area of Cotabato.

Plan
Three task groups were organized for the operation. The 602nd Infantry Brigade formed the core of the first (TG "A"), while the 603rd Infantry Brigade did the same for the second (TG "B"). The third was a reserve force (TG "C"). The infantry was supported by artillery and Philippine Air Force units under 6th Infantry Division control.

Battle
TG "A" moved northwest toward the Maladugao River and clashed with the MILF forces east of the river. TG "B" moved north towards the eastern slopes of Mt. Table, occupying the high ground. TG "C" secured their areas of operation and prevented the conflict from spreading to neighboring municipalities. Philippine Air Force's Composite Tactical Group 12 provided air support, medical evacuation, resupply and troop insertion missions.

Aftermath
The government forces achieved all their mission objectives. Casualties were light on both sides with two government troopers dead and five MILF killed.

See also
 2000 Philippine campaign against the Moro Islamic Liberation Front
 Bangsamoro peace process
 Moro conflict

References

Moro conflict
Rebellions in the Philippines
2000 in the Philippines
Presidency of Joseph Estrada
History of Cotabato